Alvaro Marenco (born 28 September 1966) is a Nicaraguan weightlifter. He competed in the men's flyweight event at the 1992 Summer Olympics.

References

External links
 

1966 births
Living people
Nicaraguan male weightlifters
Olympic weightlifters of Nicaragua
Weightlifters at the 1992 Summer Olympics
Place of birth missing (living people)